Donnchadh Ó Dubhda was King of Ui Fiachrach Muaidhe.

Life

 Donnchadh Ó Dubhda [came] with a fleet of fifty-six ships from Innse Gall and came ashore in Inis Raithin among Inse Modh in Umhall, and he seized his own land free of tribute from Cathal Crobhdearg Ua Conchobair.

Genealogy

Dubhaltach Mac Fhirbhisigh gives what appears to be his genealogy (265.2, pp. 598–99, volume I):
 /

At 265.5 (pp. 600–601), Mac Fhirbhisigh gives the genealogy of another Donnchadh Mór, son of Taichleach O Dubhda, as having three sons; Donnchach Og, royal candidate of Ui Fhiachrach, Conchabhar, and Uilliam, bishop of Ceall Aladh (Kilalla), stating that the daughter of O Floinn was mother of those sons of Donnchadh Mor.

External links
 Annals of the Four Masters

References
 The History of Mayo, Hubert T. Knox, p. 379, 1908.
 Genealach Ua fFiachrach Muaidhe, 263.8 (pp. 596–97), 264.5 (pp. 598–99); Araile do fhlathaibh Ua nDubhda/Some of the princes of Ui Dhubhda, pp. 676–681; Leabhar na nGenealach:The Great Book of Irish Genealogies, Dubhaltach Mac Fhirbhisigh (died 1671), eag. Nollaig Ó Muraíle, 2004–05, De Burca, Dublin.

People from County Sligo
People from County Mayo
13th-century Irish monarchs
Year of death unknown
Year of birth unknown